Good Newwz is an Indian 2019 Hindi-language comedy-drama film directed by Raj Mehta and produced by Dharma Productions and Cape of Good Films. It stars Akshay Kumar, Kareena Kapoor Khan, Diljit Dosanjh and Kiara Advani and revolves around two couples' trust with in vitro fertilization.

Principal photography commenced in November 2018 and wrapped up by April 2019. With this film, Kumar set a new record in 2019 by having three consecutive domestic 200 Crore Club net films alongside Mission Mangal and Housefull 4.

Plot 
Varun Batra is the CEO of a Volkswagen showroom in Mumbai and his wife, Deepti "Deepu" Batra, is a celebrity journalist. The two are a happily married couple going on seven years, but struggle to conceive a baby. Varun's sister Richa suggests the couple meet reputed fertility specialist Dr. Anand Joshi, who suggests they do in vitro fertilisation (IVF), a fertility technique that will enhance their chances. They agree, Varun submits sperm samples, and Dr. Joshi seemingly places the embryo created in his lab by Varun's sperm in Deepti's uterus.

12 days later, Varun and Deepti are hastily summoned by Dr. Anand's wife, Dr. Sandhya Joshi. Here, the two run into another homonymous couple, Honey Batra and Monika "Moni" Batra, who have taken up IVF as well. Anand guiltily reveals that a sperm mix-up has occurred: Varun's sperm have been mixed with Monika's eggs, and Honey's sperm with Deepti's eggs. Shocked beyond belief, both couples attack the two doctors. The doctors suggest that the couples go for a minor procedure so there is no chance of pregnancy. Varun later learns from Honey that Monika is pregnant with Varun's child, and Deepti is pregnant with Honey's child, but his rudeness causes Honey to fear the loss of his own child as Deepti has also gotten pregnant. He vows to prevent an abortion on Deepti's part, and he and Monika rent out a flat just above Varun's and Deepti's, much to the couple's shock.

Varun and Deepti initially project frustration against Honey and Monika during the first six months of pregnancy for interfering in their lives. However, during a routine check-up in the seventh month of pregnancy, Sandhya advises Deepti to try talking to Monika, who is probably going through as much as she is emotionally distressed. Realizing that she needs to try to understand the situation, Deepti asks Monika out for a street food treat, during which they start getting to know each other. Deepti learns that Monika had suffered two miscarriages, making her sympathise, and the women bond. However, Varun still nurses a negative attitude, especially since Deepti is not carrying his child. She takes a stand in Honey's and Monika's favour for the first time, angrily telling Varun that he never cared to understand anything that happened post the mishap.

Varun, with Deepti's confrontation still fresh in his mind, makes an attempt to bond with Honey when they meet at a bar, and they almost strike a chord with each other, until Honey expresses concern over Deepti's work commitments, which he thinks will have a negative impact on the child. Varun, incensed, snubs Honey in a possessive manner, and all else fails. An argument between the two escalates until Varun storms out and Honey is arrested by the cops after the manager drops a call.

That night, amidst heavy rains, Monika knocks on Deepti's door in desperation: she has gone into premature labour and Honey is nowhere to be found. Varun hurriedly drives Monika to the hospital and she gives birth to Varun's child. However, the newborn is shifted to a critical unit in grave condition, having been born with a respiratory defect, accelerated by Monika's history of miscarriages, with little chance of survival. As it dawns on him that the baby is in fact his, Varun begins crying and hugs Honey when he arrives after being let off with a warning. Even as Honey and Monika reunite, he goes home and breaks down in Deepti's arms, apologising for his past insensitivity.

For a few weeks, both couples pray for the baby's recovery and Monika remains in the hospital as Deepti tends to her. The baby finally recovers and after 2 months, Deepti too has a successful delivery. Varun, now a changed man, invites Honey and Monika to meet the baby. Both couples finally bond and accept each other, holding each other's babies in their arms.

Cast
 Akshay Kumar as Varun Batra
 Kareena Kapoor Khan as Deepti "Deepu" Batra
 Diljit Dosanjh as Honey Batra
 Kiara Advani as Monika "Moni" Batra
 Tisca Chopra as Dr. Sandhya Joshi
 Adil Hussain as Dr. Anand Joshi
 Anjana Sukhani as Advocate Richa Ahuja
 Faisal Rashid as Vivek Ahuja
 Sunita Dhir as Manjot Batra
 Amishka Sood as the IVF Hospital Receptionist
 Yukta Mookhey as patient at IVF centre
 Richa Kapoor as Reeta Batra
 Pradeep Kuckreja as Rajan Batra
 Kavita Pais as Kamini Kashya
 Shivam Pal as the Airport cab driver
 Karan Ashar as Akash Singhania, Varun's friend
 Taksh Dave as Tarun Batra, Varun's Showroom kid
 Vishwa Sharma as the Old IVF Patient

Special appearances
 Karan Johar in the song "Chandigarh Mein"
 Badshah in the song "Chandigarh Mein"
 Harrdy Sandhu in the song "Chandigarh Mein"
 Sukhbir in the song "Sauda Khara Khara"
 Mohit Raina as Murari, flight passenger

Production

Pre-production 
This film's name was announced on Twitter. It is Dosanjh's first film under the banner of Dharma Productions.

Filming 
Filming commenced in December 2018, with Dosanjh and Advani filming their scenes. Kumar and Kapoor joined filming in January and announced it by posting on Instagram. During a recent interview and in a Twitter post, Kumar said about Kapoor, "We are extremely fond of each other. Bebo and Lolo tease me about the amount of money I’m making and I tease them about having a flat in every building in Bandra. That's our fun banter." Anjana Sukhani joined the cast, and his was revealed to be Kumar's sister. The filming was finished in the first week of April 2019.

Release
The film was slated to release on 6 September but was pushed to 29 November, and pushed again to release on 25 December 2019, on the festival of Christmas.

Soundtrack

The film's music is composed by Tanishk Bagchi, Rochak Kohli, Lauv, Lijo George (DJ Chetas), Manj Musik (Herbie Sahara), Sukhbir and Kshmr. The songs are written by Kumaar, Rashmi Virag, Tanishk Bagchi, Sukhbir, Gurpreet Saini, Ari Leff, Michael Pollock, Herbie Sahara and Vayu. The background score is composed by John Stewart Eduri.

The song "Sauda Khara Khara" is a remake of Sukhbir's song, recreated by Lijo George-DJ Chetas, while the song "Laal Ghagraa" is a remake of Sahara's and Musik's song, and has been recreated by Bagchi, who added an interlude from Daler Mehndi's song "Ho Jayegi Balle Balle" to the recreated version.

Reception
Taran Adarsh gave the film 4 out of 5 stars and said, "Excellent. This one's a sure-fire hit. Smart writing. Fantastic humour. Heartfelt emotions... Superb performances [Akshay, Kareena, Diljit, Kiara]. 2019 will conclude with a big winner, with [Good Newwz]." Rajeev Masand of News 18 gave the film 3 out of 5 stars and said, "If Good Newwz doesn't go off the rails when the tone shifts, it's because the actors stay sincere and committed as the narrative evolves. The heart of the film is its cast anyway."

Box office
Good Newwz earned 17.56 crore at the domestic box office on its opening day. On the second day, the film earned 21.78 crore. On the third day, the film earned 25.65 crore, for a total opening weekend earning of 65.99 crore.

, with a gross of 244.21 crore in India and 74.36 crore overseas, the film has a worldwide gross collection of 318.57 crore and is the sixth highest grossing Bollywood film of 2019.

Home media 
The film was made available to stream on OTT platform Amazon Prime on 22 February 2020.

References

External links
 
 

2019 films
2019 comedy films
Indian comedy films
Indian pregnancy films
2010s Hindi-language films
Films scored by Tanishk Bagchi
Films scored by Rochak Kohli
Films scored by Manj Musik
Films about surrogacy
Films set in Mumbai
Films shot in Mumbai
Films shot in Delhi